Leah Grace Smith (born April 19, 1995) is an American competition swimmer who specializes in freestyle events.  Smith is a member of the 2016 US Women's Olympic Swimming team, and won a bronze medal in the 400 m freestyle and a gold medal in the 4 × 200 m relay at those games.

Personal life
Smith was born in Pittsburgh to a family of many elite athletes. She is a great-granddaughter of World Series champion baseball player Jimmy Smith and great-niece of boxer Billy Conn. Her sister Aileen currently swims for Columbia University.

A graduate of Oakland Catholic High School, Smith committed to swim for the University of Virginia in 2013. She earned her B.A. degree in May 2017.

Career

College career
Smith attended the University of Virginia, where she competed for the Virginia Cavaliers swimming and diving team. At the 2015 NCAA Championships, she won both the 500-yard freestyle and the 1,650-yard freestyle.  Smith repeated as NCAA Champion in both the 500-yard freestyle and the 1650-yard freestyle at the 2016 NCAA Championships.  Smith was awarded the IMP Award as the top female athlete at the University of Virginia at UVa's Annual Awards Dinner.

2014
At the 2014 Pan Pacific Swimming Championships, Smith won a gold medal and set a championship record as a member of the 4 × 200 m freestyle relay. She was also 9th in both the 400 m freestyle & 800 m freestyle. She then went on to win both the 400 m freestyle and the 4 × 200 m freestyle at the 2015 Summer Universiade (World University Games).

2015
Smith represented the United States at the 2015 World Aquatics Championships where she won a gold medal in the 4 × 200 m freestyle relay. She placed second in the 400 m freestyle event and the 800 m freestyle events at the 2016 Olympic Trials.  With only 26 spots on the Women's Olympic Swimming Team, second place athletes are not guaranteed to qualify unless and until someone qualifies for more than one event.  But in the United States "there has never been an occasion where the top two swimmers in each event, along with the top six swimmers in the 100 m and 200 m free, haven’t made the team", with the recent exception of Ryan Held, who finished sixth in the 100 m free at the 2020 Olympic Trials but was not selected to represent the US in Tokyo due to the 12-spot limit for relay-only swimmers, with Held being designated the 13th relay-only swimmer of priority. On July 3, 2016, Smith was named to the US Olympic Team.

2016

At the 2016 United States Olympic Trials, the U.S. qualifying meet for the Rio Olympics, Smith qualified for the U.S. Olympic team for the first time by finishing second in both the 400- and 800-meter freestyle events behind Katie Ledecky and third in the 200-meter freestyle.

In 2016, Smith competed at the Rio Olympic Games. She won a bronze medal in the 400-meter freestyle with a 4:01.92, behind Jazmin Carlin and Ledecky. Along with Ledecky, Maya DiRado, and Allison Schmitt, Smith won her first ever Olympic gold medal in the 4x200-meter freestyle relay. She had split 1:56.69 en route to a first-place finish in 7:43.03.

2022

World Championships

Personal bests
Long Course

References

External links
 
 
 
 
 

1995 births
Living people
American female freestyle swimmers
Swimmers at the 2016 Summer Olympics
Virginia Cavaliers women's swimmers
World Aquatics Championships medalists in swimming
Olympic bronze medalists for the United States in swimming
Olympic gold medalists for the United States in swimming
Medalists at the 2015 Summer Universiade
Medalists at the 2016 Summer Olympics
Sportspeople from Mt. Lebanon, Pennsylvania
Swimmers from Pennsylvania
Medalists at the FINA World Swimming Championships (25 m)
Universiade medalists in swimming
Universiade gold medalists for the United States